The American Oxonian (TAO; ISSN 0003-0295) is the magazine of the Association of American Rhodes Scholars. Its first issue appeared in April 1914.

History
From the beginning of the Rhodes Scholarship, the experience of American Rhodes Scholars in their Oxford University education created a bond among those who shared it and led to a desire to maintain contact with each other and to share memories and insights across the student generations.  The first attempt to create a newsletter among the American Rhodes Scholar alumni was made in 1907 with a short-lived publication called The Alumni Magazine. Seven years later, a permanent successor appeared with the first issue of the American Oxonian in April 1914 and it has existed ever since.

List of editors
The following have been editors:

 1914–1921 Frank Aydelotte (Indiana and Brasenose, 1905)
 1921–1930  C. F. Tucker Brooke (West Virginia and St John's, 1904)
 1930–1935  Alan Valentine (Pennsylvania and Balliol, 1922)
 1935–1943 Crane Brinton (Massachusetts and New College, 1919)
 1943–1946  Harvie Branscomb (Alabama and Wadham, 1914)
 1946–1949  Gordon Keith Chalmers (Rhode Island and Wadham, 1926)
 1949–1955  Paul S. Havens (New Jersey and University. 1925)
 1955–1962  E. Wilson Lyon (Mississippi and St. John's, 1925)

 2000-2014 Todd R. Breyfogel (Colorado and Corpus, 1988)
 2014-2019 Kathrin Day Lassila (Iowa and Trinity, 1982)
 2019-pres. Todd R. Breyfogel (Colorado and Corpus, 1988).

References

External links
 American Oxonian official website
 Hathitrust digital copies of back issues

 American Oxonian
Magazines established in 1914
Magazines published in Virginia
Publications associated with the University of Oxford
Alumni magazines